Midway is an unincorporated community in Halifax County, Virginia, United States, near Buffalo Springs. It lies at an elevation of 430 feet (131 m).

References

Unincorporated communities in Halifax County, Virginia
Unincorporated communities in Virginia